Ida-Viru County ( or Ida-Virumaa) is one of 15 counties of Estonia. It is the most north-eastern part of the country. The county contains large deposits of oil shale - the main mineral mined in Estonia. Oil shale is used in the production of shale oil and in thermal power plants. The capital of the county is the town of Jõhvi which is administratively united with the Jõhvi Parish; nevertheless, Narva is the largest town in the county in terms of population and at the same time the third largest city in Estonia after Tallinn and Tartu. 

In January 2019 Ida-Viru County had a population of 136,240 – constituting 10.3% of the total population in Estonia. It borders Lääne-Viru County in the west, Jõgeva County in the southwest and Russia (Leningrad Oblast) in the east. It is the only county in Estonia where Russians constitute the majority of population (73.1% in 2010), the second highest being Harju (28%).

History 
During the latter part of the period of Soviet rule of Estonia, Ida-Virumaa was called Kohtla-Järve district, and its administrative capital was Kohtla-Järve.

County Government, led by a governor, ceased to exist after administrative reform in 2017. The last governor of Ida-Viru county was Andres Noormägi.

Demographics 

In January 2017, the population of Ida-Virumaa was 143,880, which makes it the third largest county in Estonia (after Harju and Tartu counties, which include the capital Tallinn and country's second-largest city Tartu). 44.6% of the population are men and 55.4% women.

By January 2020, the population of Ida-Virumaa had decreased to 134,259, of which 33% were of native origin and 67% of foreign origin.

As a result of mass migration from the Soviet Union, Ida-Viru County is now the only county in Estonia where ethnic Russians have largely replaced the indigenous Estonian population.

By ethnic origin, on 1 January 2017, 73.1% of the population were Russians, 18.9% were Estonians, 2.3% were Ukrainians, 2.1% were Belarusians and 0.9% were Finns.

According to Estonian 2021 census population of Ida-Virumaa was 132,741. By ethnic origin 97,231 (73.25%) were Russians, 24,490 (18.45%) were Estonians, 3,265 (2.46%) Ukrainians, 2,720 (2.05%) were Belarusians 1,065 (0.80%) were Finns.

Religion

Municipalities
Ida-Virumaa County is subdivided into eight municipalities, of which four are urban ( — cities or towns) and four are rural ( — parishes). There are 217 villages in Ida-Virumaa.

Landmarks

References

External links 

Ida-Virumaa Tourism Portal
Ida-Virumaa Portal

 
Counties of Estonia
Russian communities